The Psarka is a river in the Świętokrzyskie Mountains of Świętokrzyskie Voivodeship, southern-central Poland. It has its source at the northern foot of Bukowa Góra. It has a length of 20.5 kilometres and basin area of 89.5 square kilometres. It flows through the valley of Bodzentyńską, and later flows near the village of Radkowice-Kolonia and joins the Świślina, which is a right tributary of the Kamienna. Bodzentyn Castle stands above the river which also flows past Bodzentyn.

References

Rivers of Poland
Rivers of Świętokrzyskie Voivodeship